The Tarata bombing, known also as the Miraflores bombing or Lima bombing, was a terrorist attack carried out in Tarata Street, located in Miraflores District of Lima, Peru, on 16 July 1992, by the Shining Path terrorist group. The blast was the deadliest Shining Path bombing during the Internal conflict in Peru and was part of a larger bombing campaign in the city.

The explosions happened next to the important Avenida Larco, in the business area of Miraflores, an upscale district of the city. Two trucks, each packed with 1,000 kg of explosives, exploded on the street at 9:15 pm next to the Banco de Crédito del Perú Bank located in Larco Avenue, killing 25 and wounding 155. The blast destroyed or damaged 183 homes, 400 businesses and 63 parked cars. The bombings were the beginning of a week-long Shining Path strike against the Peruvian government, a strike which caused 40 deaths and shut down much of the capital.

In the wake of the incident, galvanized by public outrage, President Alberto Fujimori intensified his crackdown on Peruvian insurgent groups, culminating in the capture on September of the same year of Shining Path leader, Abimael Guzmán, itself leading to the beginning of the end of the insurgency for the group and a decrease in terrorist activities, with fewer attacks happening after the capture of Guzmán.

Background 
In 1992, Peru was in the midst of a terrorist insurgency between different groups, the most radical and active of which was Shining Path, a militant offshoot of the Peruvian Communist Party. Earlier that year, a controversial (yet supported at the time) coup d'état led by President Alberto Fujimori on 5 April, in which he dissolved the Congress as part of a broader political crackdown, aggravated the domestic social conflict.

Earlier Shining Path attacks that year included the 15 February murder of María Elena Moyano, a community organizer in the district of Villa El Salvador, who was shot at close range then blown up with dynamite.  Also, on 5 June a car bomb exploded beside the Frecuencia Latina television station near midnight, destroying the building and its surroundings and killing journalist Alejandro Pérez. This attack marked a new era in the conflict, as it was the first time that the terrorist group had openly attacked any media entity.

The attack 

The attack took place on Thursday 16 July and targeted the Credit Bank of Peru located on Avenida Larco. During the day, Shining Path forces in Lima conducted attacks against police stations and smaller financial institutions in order to disperse the police and clear the way for the main attack. Near the planned time, there was a wavering in electric power followed by one of the blackouts common in the city at that time.

According to testimony of Shining Path militants interviewed by the Peruvian Truth and Reconciliation Commission, the twelfth Shining Path detachment in Lima, commanded by "Comrade Daniel" (later identified as Carlos Mora La Madrid in the commission's records), was responsible for conducting the attack.

The original plan was to set off explosives in front of that bank at 9:20 pm, but the establishment did not allow them to park in the place agreed. They therefore decided to leave their vehicle at the next intersection (which was Tarata Street) and allow it to drift forward until it exploded.  Once in the street, the driver slowed down and abandoned the truck.

The explosive payload was 400—500 kilograms of ammonium nitrate and fuel oil mixed with dynamite. The buildings most affected by their locations near the center of the blast were El Condado, San Pedro, Tarata, Central Residential and San Carlos. The shock wave extended for 300 meters. The explosion killed 25, wounded 155, and caused more than US$3 million in damage.

Impact 

Response from around the world denounced the Shining Path and expressed support with the Peruvian government and people in overcoming the situation.

According to specialists, it was the first time in the course of the civil war that "traditional" Lima society experienced the conflict. It was the first time that a terrorist act was carried out against a large-scale civilian target and the first direct attack on a city center.

The attack also led to self-examinations within the Shining Path, whose main leaders recognized the act as a "mistake" that should not have happened because it did not advance the group's main objective.

This attack was used as a justification for the La Cantuta massacre two days later on 18 July, in which nine students and one teacher at the National University of Education Enrique Guzmán y Valle, innocent civilians, were kidnapped and disappeared during the night by members of the Grupo Colina death squad. All were accused of having perpetrated the Tarata bombing.

Shining Path leader Abimael Guzmán was arrested in September 1992 and sentenced to life imprisonment. In 2014 he and his wife Elena Iparraguirre were tried for having ordered the Tarata bombing.

See also
 Internal conflict in Peru
 Japanese embassy hostage crisis

References

Internal conflict in Peru
Mass murder in 1992
Shining Path
Car and truck bombings in South America
Communist terrorism
1990s in Lima
History of Lima
Crime in Lima
July 1992 events in South America
Terrorist incidents in Peru
1992 murders in Peru
 
Terrorist incidents in Peru in the 1990s